Grade II* listed buildings in Wales by county:

 Anglesey 
 Blaenau Gwent 
 Bridgend 
 Caerphilly 
 Cardiff 
 Carmarthenshire 
 Ceredigion 
 Conwy 
 Denbighshire 
 Flintshire 
 Gwynedd 
 Merthyr Tydfil 
 Monmouthshire 
 Neath Port Talbot 
 Newport 
 Pembrokeshire 
 Powys 
 Rhondda Cynon Taf 
 Swansea 
 Torfaen 
 Vale of Glamorgan 
 Wrexham